In astrophysics, Dirichlet's ellipsoidal problem, named after Peter Gustav Lejeune Dirichlet, asks under what conditions there can exist an ellipsoidal configuration at all times of a homogeneous rotating fluid mass in which the motion, in an inertial frame, is a linear function of the coordinates. Dirichlet's basic idea was to reduce Euler equations to a system of ordinary differential equations such that the position of a fluid particle in a homogeneous ellipsoid at any time is a linear and homogeneous function of initial position of the fluid particle, using Lagrangian framework instead of the Eulerian framework.

History

In the winter of 1856–57, Dirichlet found some solutions of Euler equations and he presented those in his lectures on partial differential equations in July 1857 and published the results in the same month. His work was left unfinished at his sudden death in 1859, but his notes were collated and published by Richard Dedekind posthumously in 1860.  

Bernhard Riemann said, "In his posthumous paper, edited for publication by Dedekind, Dirichlet has opened up, in a most remarkable way, an entirely new avenue for investigations on the motion of a self-gravitating homogeneous ellipsoid. The further development of his beautiful discovery has a particular interest to the mathematician even apart from its relevance to the forms of heavenly bodies which initially instigated these investigations."

Riemann–Lebovitz formulation

Dirichlet's problem is generalized by Bernhard Riemann in 1860 and by Norman R. Lebovitz in modern form in 1965. Let  be the semi-axes of the ellipsoid, which varies with time. Since the ellipsoid is homogeneous, the constancy of mass requires the constancy of the volume of the ellipsoid,

same as the initial volume. Consider an inertial frame  and a rotating frame , with  being the linear transformation such that  and it is clear that  is orthogonal, i.e., . We can define an anti-symmetric matrix with this,

Without loss of generality, let us assume that the inertial frame and the moving frame coincide initially, i.e., . By definition, Dirichlet's problem is looking for a solution which is a linear function of initial condition . Let us assume the following form,

.

and we define a diagonal matrix  with diagonal elements being the semi-axes of the ellipsoid, then above equation can be written in matrix form as

where . It can shown then that the matrix  transforms the vector  linearly to the same vector at any later time , i.e., . Therefore, we see that  transforms one unit vector on the boundary to another unit vector on the boundary, in other words, it is orthogonal, i.e., . In a similar manner as before, we can define another anti-symmetric matrix as

,

The problem is one of uniform vorticity  with components given by

The pressure can take only quadratic form, can be seen from the momentum equation (and using the vanishing condition at the surface) given by

where  is the central pressure, so that . Finally, the tensor momentum equation reduce to

. 

The tensor momentum equation and the conservation of mass equation, i.e.,  provides us with ten equations for the ten unknowns, .

Dedekind's theorem

In other words, the theorem can be stated as for any state of motions that preserves a ellipsoidal figure, there is an adjoint state of motions that preserves the same ellipsoidal figure.

The following relations confirms the previous statement.

where, further

.

The typical configuration of this theorem is the Jacobi ellipsoid and its adjoint is called as Dedekind ellipsoid, in other words, both ellipsoid have same shape, but their internal fluid motions are different.

See also

Maclaurin ellipsoid
Jacobi ellipsoid

References

Astrophysics
Fluid dynamics